Club Deportivo Mirandés is a Spanish football team based in Miranda de Ebro, Province of Burgos. During the 2016/17 campaign they competed in the Segunda División and the Copa del Rey.

Competitions

Segunda División

Results summary

Results by match day

Matches

Copa Del Rey

External links
Official website 
Futbolme team profile 
BDFutbol team profile
Unofficial website 

Spanish football clubs 2016–17 season
CD Mirandés